The Pressure Pak Show is an Australian television game show. It first aired from 1957 to 1958 on ATN-7 in Sydney and GTV-9 in Melbourne. It was hosted by Jack Davey, who also hosted The Dulux Show and Give it a Go.

The program was a simulcast of a long-running Jack Davey radio programs, broadcast on the Macquarie Radio Network.

Gameplay
According to the National Film and Sound Archive website, it was a guessing game in which the panel and contestants had to determine what phrase the host had picked, within a certain amount of time. According to records of existing episodes, phrases ranged from simple (such as A Worm and Rock Around the Clock) to unusual/humorous (such as A Pygmy On Mt Lofty and Australia's 7th Best Dressed Man)

Episode status
At least 20 episodes are held by National Film and Sound Archive, along with episodes of a radio version. At least one of the surviving television episodes features Jim Russell as one of the panelists

References

External links

1957 Australian television series debuts
1958 Australian television series endings
Black-and-white Australian television shows
Seven Network original programming
Nine Network original programming
English-language television shows
1950s Australian game shows
Australian radio programs
Australian panel games
Television series based on radio series